Italy competed at the 1946 European Athletics Championships in Oslo, Norway, from 22 to 25 August 1946.

Medalists

Top eight

Men

Women

See also
 Italy national athletics team

References

External links
 EAA official site

Italy at the European Athletics Championships
Nations at the 1946 European Athletics Championships
1946 in Italian sport